Fowler's department store May refer to:
 Fowler's in Alabama, now the Belk Hudson Lofts
Fowler's in the Northeast U.S., originally Fowler, Dick & Walker